Legacy is the sixteenth  studio album by Hiroshima it was nominated for Best Pop Instrumental Album at the 52nd Annual Grammy Awards (held on January 31, 2010).

Track listing
 "Wind of Change"-7:12
 "Turning Point"-6:20
 "One Wish"-4:48
 "Dada"-6:32
 "I've Been Here Before"-5:30
 "East"-6:40
 "Roomful of Mirrors"-3:59
 "Another Place"-3:27
 "Save Yourself for Me"-4:34
 "Hawaiian Electric"-6:31
 "Thousand Cranes"-6:03

Awards

2009 albums